Psoralidin is a natural phenolic compound found in the seeds of  Psoralea corylifolia.

Chemical synthesis 
Psoralidin production starts with a based catalyzed condensation between phenyl acetate and acid chloride. To form the ring of psoralidin, an intramolecular cyclization occurs, finished off by a microwave assisted cross metathesis reaction.

Pharmacology  
Psoralidin inhibits forskolin-induced corticotrophin releasing factor gene transcription. Recently, it has shown activity in vitro against gastric, colon, prostate, and breast cancer lines. It has the capability to inhibit protein tyrosine phosphatase 1B, a key metabolite involved in insulin signaling.

Psoralidin has shown positive results in the forced swim test, a mouse model of antidepressant activity.  Psoralidin raised 5-hydroxytryptamine and 5-hydroxyindoleacetic acid levels in the brain. Dopamine levels changed as well as a result of psoralidin consumption. Stress hormones in mice such as serum corticotropin releasing factor, adrenal corticotropin releasing hormone, and corticosterone were reduced after psoralidin administration.

Structure  
Structurally, psoralidin is a coumestan derivative; it has an isopentenyl group at the second carbon position of coumestrol. Psoralidin is insoluble in water, making in vivo studies difficult.

References 

Natural phenols
Lactones
Psoraleeae